Route 307 is a collector road in the Canadian province of Nova Scotia. 

It is located in Cumberland County and connects Wallace at Trunk 6 with Wentworth Centre at Trunk 4.

Communities
Wentworth Centre
Lower Wentworth
Six Mile Road
Wallace Station
Wallace

Blue Route
Traffic volumes are comparatively light on this highway. As a result, Route 376 and a portion of Trunk 4 have become part of Nova Scotia's Blue Route, a designated  cycling corridor, connecting Masstown to Wallace.

Parks
Wentworth Provincial Park

References

307
Roads in Cumberland County, Nova Scotia